Bulgaria competed at the 1980 Summer Olympics in Moscow, USSR. 271 competitors, 183 men and 88 women, took part in 151 events in 20 sports.

Medalists

Gold
 Petar Lesov — Boxing, men's flyweight
 Lyubomir Lyubenov – canoeing, men's C1 1000m Canadian singles
 Stojan Deltshev – gymnastics, men's horizontal bar
 Yanko Rusev – weightlifting, men's lightweight
 Asen Zlatev – weightlifting, men's middleweight
 Georgi Raikov – wrestling, men's Greco-Roman heavyweight
 Valentin Raychev – wrestling, men's freestyle welterweight 
 Ismail Abilov – wrestling, men's freestyle middleweight

Silver
 Mariya Petkova – athletics, women's discus throw 
 Krasimira Bogdanova, Diana Braynova-Dilova, Vanya Dermendzhieva, Silviya Germanova, Nadka Golcheva, Petkana Makayeeva, Penka Metodieva, Angelina Mikhaylova, Snezhana Mikhaylova, Kostadinka Radkova, Evladiya Slavcheva, and Penka Stoyanova – basketball, women's team competition
 Lyubomir Lyubenov – canoeing, men's C1 500m Canadian singles
 Vanja Gesheva-Tsvetkova – canoeing, women's K1 500m kayak singles 
 Georgi Gadshev, Svetoslav Ivanov, and Petar Mandazhiev – equestrian, team dressage
 Dimitar Zapryanov – judo, men's heavyweight 
 Nadya Filipova, Ginka Gyurova, Mariyka Modeva, Rita Todorova and Iskra Velinova – rowing, women's coxed fours 
 Yordan Angelov, Dimitar Dimitrov, Stefan Dimitrov, Stoyan Gunchev, Khristo Iliev, Petko Petkov, Kaspar Simeonov, Khristo Stoyanov, Mitko Todorov, Tsano Tsanov, Emil Valchev, and Dimitar Zlatanov – volleyball, men's team competition
 Stefan Dimitrov – weightlifting, men's featherweight 
 Blagoi Blagoev – weightlifting, men's light heavyweight 
 Rumen Aleksandrov – weightlifting, men's Middle Heavyweight 
 Valentin Khristov – weightlifting, men's heavyweight 
 Aleksandar Tomov – wrestling, men's Greco-Roman Super Heavyweight
 Mikho Dukov – wrestling, men's freestyle featherweight
 Ivan Yankov – wrestling, men's freestyle lightweight 
 Slavcho Chervenkov – wrestling, men's freestyle heavyweight

Bronze
 Petar Petrov – athletics, men's 100 metres
 Ivailo Khristov — Boxing, men's Light Flyweight
 Borislav Borisov, Lazar Khristov, Ivan Manev, and Bozhidar Milenkov – canoeing, men's K4 1000m Kayak Fours 
 Borislav Ananiev and Nikolay Ilkov – canoeing, men's C2 500m Canadian Pairs
 Stojan Deltshev – gymnastics, men's All-Around Individual 
 Iliyan Nedkov – judo, men's Half Lightweight (65 kg) 
 Bogdan Dobrev, Mincho Nikolov, Lyubomir Petrov, and Ivo Rusev – rowing, men's Quadruple Sculls 
 Ani Bakova, Rumeliana Boncheva, Dolores Nakova, and Mariana Serbezova – rowing, women's Quadruple Sculls 
 Siyka Kelbecheva and Stoyanka Kurbatova-Gruicheva – rowing, women's Coxless Pairs 
 Lyubcho Dyakov — Shooting, men's Free Pistol 
 Petar Zapryanov — Shooting, men's Small-bore Rifle, prone 
 Verka Borisova-Stoyanova, Tsvetana Bozhurina, Rositsa Dimitrova, Tanya Dimitrova-Todorova, Maya Georgieva-Stoeva, Tanya Gogova, Valentina Ilieva-Kharalampieva, Rumyana Kaisheva, Anka Kristolova-Uzunova, and Silva Petrunova – volleyball, women's team competition
 Mincho Pashov – weightlifting, men's lightweight
 Nedelcho Kolev – weightlifting, men's middleweight
 Mladen Mladenov – wrestling, men's Greco-Roman Flyweight 
 Pavel Pavlov – wrestling, men's Greco-Roman Middleweight 
 Nermedin Selimov – wrestling, men's freestyle flyweight

Archery

In its first appearance in Olympic archery, Bulgaria entered one man and one woman.
Men

Women

Athletics

Men
Track & road events

Field events

Combined events – Decathlon

Women
Track & road events

Field events

Combined events – pentathlon

Basketball

Women's tournament
The women's tournament was decided in a round robin group with all six teams. The first two places competed for the gold medal, while the third and fourth places for the bronze. The remaining teams retain their group ranks for the final standings. The host nation finished the group phase undefeated and won the gold against Bulgaria. Yugoslavia would go on to win the bronze medal against Hungary.

Gold-medal match

Boxing

Men's Light Flyweight (– 48 kg)
Ismail Mustafov →  Bronze Medal
 First Round — Bye
 Second Round – defeated Gerard Hawkins (Ireland) on points (5-0) 
 Quarter-finals – defeated Ahmed Siad (Algeria) on points (5-0) 
 Semi-finals – lost to Hipolito Ramos (Cuba) on points (1-4)

Men's flyweight (– 51 kg)
Petar Lesov →  Gold Medal
 First Round – defeated Onofre Ramirez (Nicaragua) on points (5-0) 
 Second Round – defeated Hassen Sherif (Ethiopia) on points (5-0) 
 Quarter-finals – defeated Roman Gilberto (Mexico) on points (4-1) 
 Semi-finals – defeated Hugh Russell (Ireland) on points (5-0) 
 Final – defeated Viktor Miroshnichenko (Soviet Union) after referee stopped contest in 2nd round

Men's Bantamweight (– 54 kg)
Aleksandr Radev
 First Round — Bye
 Second Round – lost to John Siryakibbe (Uganda) after referee stopped contest in first round

Men's featherweight (– 57 kg)
Tsacho Andreikovski
 First Round — Bye
 Second Round – defeated William Azanor (Nigeria) after knock-out in first round
 Third Round – defeated Barthelémy Adoukonu (Benin) after knock-out in second round
 Quarter-finals – lost to Viktor Rybakov (Soviet Union) on points (1-4)

Men's lightweight (– 60 kg)
Yordan Lesov
 First Round – defeated Patrice Martin (Benin) after knock-out in first round
 Second Round – defeated Tibor Dezamits (Hungary) on points (4-1)
 Quarter-finals – lost to Viktor Demyanenko (Soviet Union) on points (0-5)

Men's light-welterweight (– 63.5 kg)
Margarit Anastasov
 First Round – lost to Ace Rusevski (Yugoslavia) on points (1-4)

Men's heavyweight (+ 81 kg)
Petr Stoimenov
 First Round – defeated Naasan Ajjoub (Syria) after referee stopped contest in second round
 Quarter-finals – lost to Jürgen Fanghänel (East Germany) after referee stopped contest in second round

Canoeing

Sprint
Men

Women

Cycling

Six cyclists represented Bulgaria in 1980.

Road

Track
Time trial

Diving

Men

Equestrian

Dressage

Eventing

Show jumping

Fencing

Four fencers, all men, represented Bulgaria in 1980.

Men's sabre
 Vasil Etropolski
 Khristo Etropolski
 Georgi Chomakov

Men's team sabre
 Khristo Etropolski, Nikolay Marincheshki, Vasil Etropolski, Georgi Chomakov

Gymnastics

Judo

Men

Modern pentathlon

Three male pentathletes represented Bulgaria in 1980.

Rowing

Men

Women

Sailing

Open

Shooting

Open

Swimming

Men

Women

Volleyball

Men's team competition

Preliminary round

Pool A

|}

|}

Semifinals

|}

Gold-medal match

|}

Team Roster
 Stoyan Gunchev
 Hristo Stoyanov
 Dimitar Zlatanov
 Dimitar Dimitrov
 Tsano Tsanov
 Stefan Dimitrov
 Petko Petkov
 Mitko Todorov
 Kaspar Simeonov
 Emil Valtchev
 Hristo Iliev
 Yordan Angelov

Women's team competition

Preliminary round
Teams in two groups played each other in a round to decide, for which place each of them should compete in the semi-finals and the finals.

Group B

|}

|}

Semifinal

|}

3rd Place Match

|}

Team Roster
 Tania Dimitrova
 Valentina Ilieva
 Galina Stancheva
 Silva Petrunova
 Anka Khristolova 
 Verka Borisova
 Margarita Gerasimova
 Rumiana Kaicheva 
 Maia Georgieva 
 Tania Gogova 
 Tsvetana Bozhurina 
 Rositsa Dimitrova

Water polo

Preliminary round

Group C

Final Round

Group B

Team Roster
 Volodia Sirakov
 Andrei Andreev
 Kiril Kiriakov
 Asen Denchev
 Vasil Nanov
 Anton Partalev
 Petar Kostadinov
 Nikolai Stamatov
 Biser Georgiev
 Matei Popov
 Georgi Gospodinov

Weightlifting

Men

Wrestling

Men's freestyle

Men's Greco-Roman

References

Nations at the 1980 Summer Olympics
1980 Summer Olympics
1980 in Bulgarian sport